Brad Rhiness (born November 6, 1956) is a Canadian former professional ice hockey player who played in the World Hockey Association (WHA). Drafted in the first round of the 1974 WHA Amateur Draft by the San Diego Mariners, Rhiness played parts of two WHA seasons with the Mariners and Indianapolis Racers. He was also drafted in the seventh round of the 1976 NHL Amateur Draft by the Vancouver Canucks.

Awards
1978–79 NEHL Second All-Star Team

References

External links

1956 births
Canadian ice hockey centres
Erie Blades players
Ice hockey people from Ontario
Indianapolis Racers players
Kingston Canadians players
Living people
Muskegon Mohawks players
Oklahoma City Blazers (1965–1977) players
People from Huntsville, Ontario
Philadelphia Firebirds (AHL) players
San Diego Mariners draft picks
San Diego Mariners players
Syracuse Firebirds players
Vancouver Canucks draft picks
Canadian expatriate ice hockey players in the United States